The Venezuelan Bolivarian Marine Corps are known as the Bolivarian Marine Infantry or formally as the Marine Division "General Simon Bolivar" (División de Infantería de Marina General Simón Bolívar) and is part of the Bolivarian Navy of Venezuela. Its motto is: Valor y Lealtad (Valor and Loyalty).

History

Nineteenth century
The Venezuelan Marines trace their history back to the combined marines corps of Gran Colombia which was formed in 1822 and was dissolved in 1829 following Venezuela's secession from Gran Colombia. This was surprising as the Marine Corps of the Confederation largely consisted of Venezuelans. The Marines' most notable engagement in this era was the Battle of Lake Maracaibo (1823). During this time the Marines were mostly manned by personnel by the Grand Colombian Army, and used army-style ranks while wearing naval uniforms.

Twentieth century
In the beginning of the 20th century, during the term of President Cipriano Castro, the Navy had a marine artillery command manned by Venezuelan Army personnel tasked to provide artillery crews aboard its vessels.

After years of inactivity the Venezuelan Marines were finally reformed at Puerto Cabello on 1 July 1938 when a company was formed to provide ships detachments. A second company was formed on 8 December 1939 and a third in 1943. They were then merged into the 1st Marine Battalion (Battalion de Infanteria de Marina -BIM) Simon Bolivar, headquartered at Puerto Cabello, on 11 December 1945. This date is looked upon as the official anniversary of the marines.  In February 1946 a second BIM General Rafael Urdaneta was raised at Puerto Cabello and the original BIM became the 1st battalion and was then moved to Marquetia. Marine headquarters was then located in Caracas. The third Battalion Mariscal Antonio Jose de Sucre was then formed up in 1958 at Carupano, the very same year the Marines became a full command of the Navy. In the late 1970s the Amphibious Assault Company, equipped with LVTP-7s and the Marine Anti-Aircraft Artillery Company, equipped with M42 Dusters, were raised.  The 4th Battalion General Francisco de Miranda was raised in the early 1980s and initially consisted of the Amphibious Assault Company and the Marine Anti-Aircraft Artillery Company.

In June 1962, the 2nd Marine Battalion at Puerto Cabello rebelled. The rebellion was put down by the navy and other marines from the 1st and 3rd Marine Battalions.

Between 1975 and 1994 the marines underwent two new adjustments to its organization. On 11 December 2000, by presidential decree, the Marine Infantry were honored with the name Gen. Simón Bolívar Marine Division. On 15 October 2003  the Naval Police Command Gran Mariscal de Ayacucho was integrated into the ranks and organization of the Marines.

On 5 April  2005, the Marine Corps of Engineers, was activated and was later placed directly under the General Command of the Navy by Presidential Resolution No. DG-031,764 dated 21 July 2005. In turn, the Naval Police Brigade "Gran Mariscal de Ayacucho Antonio José de Sucre" was formally reestablished as the Naval Police Command ceasing its dependence on the Division and remained attached to the Naval Operations Command directly.

Organization
Headquartered in Meseta de Mamo, Vargas, the estimated numerical strength of this unit is of approx. 11,000 men and women. Its mission is to "enlist and direct its units in order to form the disembarking force and/or support of amphibious or special operations; executing naval safeguarding and environmental policing, as well as actively participating in the national development". It is divided into 9 active brigades and a headquarters unit.

As of 2020, Vice Admiral Luis Somaza Chacón is the current commandant of the Marine Corps.

Major Units
 Headquarters Battalion
 Marine Communications Battalion CDR Felipe Baptista
 Marine Logistics Support Battalion ADM Luis Brión
 393rd Marine Air Defense Artillery Battalion RADM José María García
 Marine Corps Basic School
 Marine Special Operations School CPT Rafael Francisco Rodríguez
 8th Marine Special Operations Command Brigade Generalissimo Francisco de Miranda
 HQ and Service Company
 81st Marine Special Operations (Commando) Battalion LTCDR Henry Lilong Garcia
 82nd Marine Force Reconnaissance Battalion GC Jose Felix Ribas
 83rd Marine Combat Engineers Battalion Chief Guaicaipuro
 84th Marine Special Operations Support Battalion Juan German Roscio
 Naval and Marine Reserve and Marine Replacement Regiment RADM Armando López Conde
 Regimental HQ
 Naval Reserve Battalion Battle of Chichiriviche
 Naval Reserve Battalion Battle of Punta Brava
 Naval Reserve Battalion Expedición de la Vela de Coro
 Naval Reserve Battalion Expedición de Los Cayos
 1st Marine Reserve Battalion

1st Marine Brigade (Amphibious) CPT Manuel Ponte Rodriguez

 Brigade HQ and Service Company
 11th Marine Battalion GEN Rafael Urdaneta
 12nd Marine Battalion (Assault Amphibian) LCDR Manuel Ponce Lugo
 13th Marine Field Artillery Battalion LTGEN  Agustín Codazzi
 14th Marine Logistics Battalion RADM José Ramón Yépez

2nd Marine Brigade (Amphibious)  RADM José Eugenio Hernández

 Brigade HQ and Service Company
 21st Marine Battalion MSHL Antonio José de Sucre
 22nd Marine Battalion GEN Santiago Mariño
 23rd Marine Battalion LTGEN José Francisco Bermudez
 24th Marine Logistics Battalion GEN Juan Bautista Arismendi
 25th Marine Field Artillery Battalion LTGEN Juan Antonio Anzoategui

3rd Marine Brigade (Amphibious) MGEN Manuela Saenz

 Brigade HQ and Service Company
 31st Marine Battalion (Assault Amphibian) GEN Simón Bolívar
 32nd Marine Battalion ADM Luis Brión
 33rd Marine Field Artillery Battalion VADM Lino de Clemente
 34th Marine Logistics Battalion Pedro Gual

4th Marine Brigade (Amphibious) ADM Alejandro Petión

 Brigade HQ and Service Company
 41st Marine Battalion (Assault Amphibian) Generalissimo Sebastian Francisco de Miranda Rodriguez
 42nd Marine Battalion RADM Renato Beluche
 43rd Marine Field Artillery Battalion (Self-Propelled and MRL) MSHL Juan Crisostomo Falcón (new raising)
 44th Marine Logistics Battalion Ana Maria Campos

5th Marine Riverine Brigade LTCDR José Tomas Machado

 Brigade HQ and Service Company
 1st Riverine Command LTGEN Daniel Florence O'Leary
 2nd Riverine Command GEN Ezequiel Zamora
 3rd Riverine Command Jose Maria Espana
 1st Marine Fluvial Squadron CPT Antonio Diaz
 5th Riverline Support Battalion LTJG Vicente Parado
 5th Marine Air Group LT Pedro Lucas Urribarri

6th Marine Border Riverine Brigade ADM Manuel Ezequeil Bruzual

 Brigade HQ and Service Company
 5th Riverline Command RADM Jose Maria Garcia
 6th Border Riverline Command LT Jacinto Muñoz
 7th Riverine Command LT Pedro Camejo
 6th Riverine Support Battalion CDR Joaquin Quintero
 6th Marine Air Group GC Jose Gregorio Monagas

7th Marine Border Riverine Brigade MGEN Franz António Risques Irribarren

 Brigade HQ and Service Company
 8th Upper Orinoco (Riverine) command VADM Armando Medina
 9th Middle Orinoco (Riverine) command VADM Francisco Pérez Hernández
 7th Marine Air Group CPT Sebastian Boguier
 7th Riverine Support Battalion COL Antonio Ricaurte (raised 2015)

Each border/riverine command consists of the following:
 Command headquarters,
 a headquarters and service company,
 a Marine Battalion,
 a Maintenance company and
 a Service Support company.

These units have a base of operations and five naval outposts with a Marine company and no less than 6 assault and river combat speedboats each.

Naval Police Command Grand Marshal of Ayacucho Antonio José de Sucre

 Command HQ
 Command Staff
 Naval Police Training Center 
 9th Naval Police Brigade
 Brigade HQ Company
 1st Naval Police Battalion CPT Alejo Sánchez Navarro
 2nd Naval Police Battalion RADM Matías Padrón
 3rd Naval Police Battalion RADM Otto Pérez Seijas
 4th Naval Police Battalion CPT Juan Daniel Daniels
 Naval Police Commando Company
  Naval Police Commando Sniper Platoon
 Naval Police Investigations Division
 Naval Police Canine Training Unit
 Naval Police Finance Division

Naval Corps of Engineers 
Under the direct control of the Navy but operationally deployed with the Marine Corps

1st Naval Construction Brigade RADM José Ramón Yépez 

 Brigade HQ
 141st Combat Engineers Battalion LT Jerónigo Rengifo
 142nd Maintenance and Construction Battalion RADM José María García
 143rd Maintenance and Construction Battalion CPT Nicolás Jolly
 145th Maintenance and Construction Battalion LT Pedro Camejo

2nd Naval Construction Brigade RADM Jose Prudencio Padilla 
 Brigade HQ
 144th Maintenance and Construction Battalion GEN Ezequiel Zamora
 146th Maintenance and Construction Battalion CPT Agustin Armario

Arms and equipment
Naval Infantry's equipment is the same standard issue as the rest of the armed forces, excluding Special Forces armaments. Armored units and heavy equipment of the Naval Infantry is the following:

Armor

 8x8 VN-1 Amphibious Armored Personnel Carrier. *China (all delivered 2015)
 NORINCO VN18 Amphibious Light Tank and VN16 Amphibious Assault APC. * China
 6x6 Engesa EE-11 Urutu Amphibious Assault APC. *Brazil – 38 EE-11, (3 EE-11 VCMDM3S1+3 EE-11 VRCPM3S2 +12 EE-11 VTTRM3S7 +20 EE-11 VTTRM3S6, all to be modernized)
 FMC LVTP-7 Amphibious Assault Armored Vehicle. *US – 11 AAVT-7s, (1 AAVTC-7 +1AAVTR-7 +9AAVTP-7)

Artillery and anti-aircraft batteries

 SR-5. (China)
 SM4 mortar. (China)
 Oto Melara M-56 105/14mm towed howitzer. (Italy)- 50
 Thomson-Brandt MO-120 120mm heavy mortar. (France)- 35
 Buk-M2EK wheeled air defense missile launcher  (Russia) – 10
 Bofors RBS-70 anti-aircraft battery. (Sweden)- 20
 CAVIM M-66 Cazador mortar (Venezuela)

Tactical and transport land vehicles

 Land Rover Defender 90HT/110HT. (United Kingdom) – +500
 Ford M151. (United States)
 Chevrolet M-705. (United States)
 IAI M-325 Commandacar
 Tiuna (Venezuela)
 Steyr-MAN L-80 series, tactical transport truck (Austria)
 Engesa EE-25, tactical transport truck (Brazil)

Speedboats and launches

 Guardian 22' patrol speedboat. (United States)
 Guardian 25' patrol speedboat. (United States)

Other models in service include Caroní, Manapiare, Caimán, 22 Apure/Apure II assault launches, (all designed and made in Venezuela) and US Coibas.

See also
Marines
Venezuelan Navy

References

External links
Official website of the Marine Corps

Marines
Bolivarian Navy of Venezuela